Darreh Zard or Darreh-ye Zard may refer to:
 Darreh Zard, Khuzestan